Marinelli Field is a stadium in Rockford, Illinois located in Blackhawk Park and is overseen by the Rockford Park District. It is primarily used for baseball.

The ball field is in the north end of Blackhawk Park and is bounded by 15th Avenue (north, right field); Nelson Boulevard and the Rock River (west, left field); commercial businesses to the east; and the rest of the city park to the south and southeast. It sits just a few blocks west of Beyer Stadium, which is also on 15th.

The field has served as the stadium for two minor league franchises:

 Rockford RiverHawks (2002–2005)
 Rockford Reds (1999)
 Rockford Cubbies (1995–1998)
 Rockford Royals (1993–1994)
 Rockford Expos (1988–1992)

In addition, it is the current home of the amateur Rockford Foresters, a summer collegiate-league team.

The Rockford Expos, a farm team of the Montreal Expos,  The Rockford Royals, a farm team of the Kansas City Royals, the Rockford Cubbies, a farm team of the Chicago Cubs and the Rockford Reds, a farm team of the Cincinnati Reds all preceded the organization's move to Dayton, Ohio to become the Dayton Dragons (2000–present)

WTVO-TV an ABC affiliate in Rockford, Illinois reported on Tuesday, September 16 that a group of Chicago area investors were looking to bring a Central Illinois Collegiate League (CICL) team to Rockford, which would play at Marinelli Field beginning in the summer of 2010.  The group of Chicago area investors is known as Three Strikes Baseball Corp.  In November 2009, the CICL announced that it would merge with a new summer collegiate league and form the new 11-team Prospect League.

The Rockford Foresters will return to play at Marinelli Field for the summer of 2012. The Foresters announced its team colors and logo on January 13, 2010.

Minor league baseball venues
Baseball venues in Illinois
Buildings and structures in Rockford, Illinois
Sports venues in Rockford, Illinois
Tourist attractions in Rockford, Illinois
Defunct Midwest League ballparks